Donald D. Price (1942 – 2016) was an American neuroscientist and psychologist known for his research on the mechanisms of pain in humans. He served as Professor of Oral and Maxillofacial Surgery and Diagnostic Sciences at the University of Florida, where he was named a 
UF Research Foundation Professor in 2003. He was named an honorary member of the International Association for the Study of Pain in 2014. The University of Florida's Center for Pain Research and Behavioral Health awards the Donald D. Price Memorial Publication Award in his honor.

References

External links

1942 births
2016 deaths
American neuroscientists
20th-century American psychologists
University of Florida faculty
University of California, Davis alumni
Virginia Commonwealth University faculty
National Institutes of Health faculty